Norman Donald MacCallum  was the Dean of Argyll and The Isles in the Scottish Episcopal Church.

Born on 26 April 1947 and educated at the University of Edinburgh he was ordained in 1972  and began his career  with the Livingston Ecumenical Experiment. Later he was Rector of  St Mary's, Grangemouth, Priest-in-charge of St Catharine's, Bo’ness and Provost of St John's Cathedral, Oban. From 2000 he was Administrator of the  Scottish Episcopal Clergy Appraisal Scheme, a post he held until 2005. He retired in 2012.

References

1947 births
Living people
People educated at Oban High School
Alumni of the University of Edinburgh
Scottish Episcopalian priests
Deans of Argyll and The Isles
Provosts of St John's Cathedral, Oban